The 2019–20 Northeastern Huskies men's basketball team represents Northeastern University during the 2019–20 NCAA Division I men's basketball season. The Huskies, led by 14th-year head coach Bill Coen, play their home games at Matthews Arena in Boston, Massachusetts as members of the Colonial Athletic Association.

Previous season
The Huskies finished the 2018–19 season 23–11, 14–4 in CAA play finish second place. In the CAA tournament they defeated UNC Wilmington, College of Charleston, and Hofstra to become CAA Tournament champions. They earned the CAA's automatic bid to the NCAA tournament as a #13 seed where they lost in the first round to Kansas.

Offseason

Departures

Incoming transfers

Recruiting class of 2019

Recruiting class of 2020

Roster

Schedule and results 

|-
!colspan=9 style=| Non-conference regular season

|-
!colspan=9 style=| CAA regular season

|-
!colspan=9 style=| CAA tournament
|-

References

Northeastern Huskies men's basketball seasons
Northeastern
Northeastern
Northeastern